134 (one hundred [and] thirty-four) is the natural number following 133 and preceding 135.

In mathematics
134 is a nontotient since there is no integer with exactly 134 coprimes below it. And it is a noncototient since there is no integer with 134 integers with common factors below it.

In Roman numerals, 134 is a Friedman number since CXXXIV = XV * (XC/X) - I.

In the military
  was a Mission Buenaventura-class fleet oiler during World War II
  was a United States Navy  during World War II
  was a United States Navy  between World War I and World War II
  was the lead ship of the United States Navy  heavy cruisers during World War II
  was a United States Navy General G. O. Squier-class transport ship during World War II
  was a United States Navy converted steel-hulled trawler,  during World War II
  was a United States Navy  which saw battle during the Battle of Midway
  was a United States Navy  during World War II
 , was a United States S-class submarine which was later transferred to the Royal Navy
  was a United States Navy Crater-class cargo ship during World War II
 134 (Bedford) Squadron in the United Kingdom Air Training Corps
 The 134th (48th Highlanders) Battalion, CEF was a Toronto, Ontario unit of the Canadian Expeditionary Force during World War I
 The 134th Pennsylvania Volunteer Infantry was an infantry regiment in the Union Army during the American Civil War

In sports
 Former running back George Reed for the Saskatchewan Roughriders held the career record of 134 rushing touchdowns

In transportation
 London Buses route 134 is a Transport for London contracted bus route in London

In other fields
134 is also:
 The year AD 134 or 134 BC
 134 AH is a year in the Islamic calendar that corresponds to 751 – 752 CE
 134 Sophrosyne is a large main belt asteroid with a dark surface and most likely a primitive carbonaceous composition
 Caesium-134 has a half-life of 2.0652 years. It is produced both directly (at a very small yield) as a fission product, but not via beta decay of other fission product nuclides of mass 134, since beta decay stops at stable Xe-134
 The atomic number of an element temporarily called untriquadium
 Article 134 of the American UCMJ is the catch-all article, for offences "not specifically mentioned in this chapter." Used to prosecute a wide variety of offences, from cohabitation by personnel not married to each other to statements critical of the U.S. President. Some prisoners at Abu Ghraib were tagged with this number.
 Sonnet 134 by William Shakespeare
  was the highest temperature ever recorded on Earth.
 United States Immigration Support Form I-134, Affidavit of Support

See also 
 List of highways numbered 134
 United Nations Security Council Resolution 134
 United States Supreme Court cases, Volume 134

Integers